The Congregation of the Most Holy Rosary of the Order of Preachers, better known as the Dominican Sisters of Sinsinawa is an American religious institute of the Regular, or religious branch of the Third Order of St. Dominic. It was founded in 1847. The General Motherhouse is located in Sinsinawa, Wisconsin.

History
The congregation was founded in 1847 by Samuel Mazzuchelli, O.P., (1806-1864) a pioneer Italian Dominican friar and missionary priest to the Upper Midwest. By the time of the founder's death in 1864, the community numbered nearly 25, and had blossomed to 100 within a decade. By the end of the century, the congregation had grown to almost 400 Sisters, and had begun to spread to work in schools throughout the region. Growth continued until the mid-20th century, when the congregation peaked at nearly 2,000 members in the 1960s. Like many other religious institutes, numbers then began to drop dramatically after the Second Vatican Council.

Overview
The motherhouse of the congregation, Sinsinawa Mound, has been called the "Hill of Grace". Since 1847, more than 3,200 women have ascended its slopes to take their vows as Sinsinawa Dominican Sisters, then departed to preach and teach the Gospel. Today, the Mound still serves as the motherhouse for about 450 sisters and more than 240 associates. The congregation also sponsors Dominican Volunteers USA for men and women who wish to share in their work.

Mission
Sinsinawa Dominicans are called to proclaim the Gospel through the ministry of preaching and teaching to participate in the building of a holy and just society.

These Dominican Sisters are associated with Edgewood College in Madison, Wisconsin (edgewood.edu), Dominican University in River Forest, Illinois and Dominican High School in Whitefish Bay, Wisconsin.

Ministry today
Direction 2016–21:

Sinsinawa Dominican sisters are dedicated to preaching and teaching the Gospel, believing that at the heart of ministry is relationship. The sisters are committed to participating with others to build a holy and just society in the United States and abroad through ministry, or service to others. They are called to a wide variety of ministries: some are teachers, counselors, and caregivers. Others are doctors, lawyers, and pastoral ministers. Currently, their missions outside the United States include Mexico, Bolivia, Guatemala, Italy, and Trinidad and Tobago.

References

External links
Sinsinawa Dominican Sisters website
In Good Humor: Lighter Moments from Sinsinawa Dominican Sisters

Catholic Church in Wisconsin
Congregations of Dominican Sisters
Religious organizations established in 1847
Catholic religious institutes established in the 19th century
1847 establishments in Wisconsin Territory
Buildings and structures in Grant County, Wisconsin
Education in Grant County, Wisconsin
Tourist attractions in Grant County, Wisconsin